Fabrizio Danese (born 26 June 1995) is an Italian football player. He plays in Spain for Linense.

Club career
He started playing football at the age of 5 at the Lodigiani football school. He later wore the shirts of Cisco Lodigiani, Cisco Roma, Pro Roma. At the age of 16 he played his first game in Excellence with Tor Sapienza. age of 17 makes his Serie D debut with Civitavecchia Calcio. In the same year he moved to Brescia Calcio in the spring. He made his Serie C debut for Prato on 14 September 2016 in a game against Carrarese.

On 31 January 2019 he signed with Arzachena.

On 24 July 2019, he signed with the Spanish club Linense. He scored his first goal with Linense on 23 November 2019 against Sevilla Atletico.

References

External links
 

1995 births
Living people
Footballers from Rome
Italian footballers
Association football defenders
Serie C players
Serie D players
Nuorese Calcio players
A.C. ChievoVerona players
A.C. Prato players
S.S. Akragas Città dei Templi players
S.S. Arezzo players
Segunda División B players
Real Balompédica Linense footballers
Italian expatriate footballers
Italian expatriate sportspeople in Spain
Expatriate footballers in Spain